Elizabeth Grace Sugg, Baroness Sugg  (born 2 May 1977) is a British politician, life peer and former political adviser. A member of the Conservative Party, she served as Parliamentary Under-Secretary of State for the Overseas Territories and Sustainable Development between February and November 2020.

Education and career 

Sugg grew up and went to school in Surrey attending Epsom College. She graduated from Newcastle University with a degree in Politics and Economics.

She served as Head of Operations at 10 Downing Street under the premiership of David Cameron.
She led the preparation of key international meetings hosted by the UK such as the G7 Summit in Lough Erne in 2013 and the NATO Summit 2014 in Wales.
She was appointed a Commander of the Order of the British Empire (CBE) in the 2015 Dissolution Honours.

She was nominated for a life peerage in the 2016 Prime Minister's Resignation Honours and was created Baroness Sugg, of Coldharbour in the London Borough of Lambeth, on 30 August 2016.

Sugg was a government whip as a Baroness-in-Waiting from June to October 2017. She was then appointed Parliamentary Under-Secretary of State for Aviation at the Department for Transport on 27 October 2017, replacing Lord Callanan. From 23 April 2019 until the February 2020 reshuffle she was Parliamentary Under-Secretary of State for International Development. She was appointed Parliamentary Under-Secretary of State and Minister for the Overseas Territories and Sustainable Development on 13 February 2020, and Special Envoy for Girls' Education on 5 March 2020.

On 25 November 2020 she resigned from her ministerial role at the Foreign, Commonwealth and Development Office following the announcement by the Chancellor of the Exchequer, Rishi Sunak, that the overseas aid budget would be reduced.

Notes

References

1977 births
Living people
Alumni of Newcastle University
British special advisers
Commanders of the Order of the British Empire
Conservative Party (UK) life peers
Life peeresses created by Elizabeth II
People educated at Epsom College